Platyptilia chondrodactyla is a moth of the family Pterophoridae. It is found in Turkey.

References

Moths described in 1920
chondrodactyla
Endemic fauna of Turkey
Insects of Turkey
Taxa named by Aristide Caradja